Besonprodil (CI-1041) is a drug which acts as an NMDA antagonist, selective for the NR2B subunit. It is under development as a supplemental medication for Parkinson's disease, and has been shown in animals to be effective in counteracting the dyskinesias associated with long term treatment with levodopa and related drugs.

References

NMDA receptor antagonists
Fluoroarenes
Piperidines